Piz Dolf (Romansh) or Trinserhorn (German) is a mountain of the Glarus Alps, located on the border between the cantons of St. Gallen and Graubünden.

Piz Sardona is to the north across a glacier, and to its west Piz Segnas. Both Piz Segnas and Piz Dolf show the line of the Glarus thrust in its upper part. The easiest access to the area is an aerial cableway to Fil de Cassons from Flims or any of various hikes to this ridge lying southeast of Piz Dolf. One route uses the ascent via Val Bargis (the path can be seen on the picture (right) crossing the southern face of Piz Dolf in vegetation).

References

External links
Piz Dolf on Summitpost
Piz Dolf on Hikr

Mountains of the Alps
Alpine three-thousanders
Mountains of Switzerland
World Heritage Sites in Switzerland
Mountains of Graubünden
Glarus thrust
Flims
Trin
Mountains of the canton of St. Gallen
Graubünden–St. Gallen border